The Joint Baltic American National Committee, Inc. (JBANC) is a non-profit organization that monitors issues affecting Baltic-American communities in the United States and the nations of Estonia, Latvia, and Lithuania. The organization was founded on April 27, 1961 through a joint proclamation by Estonian National Committee in the U.S.A. Chairman Julius Kangur; American Latvian Association, Inc., in the United States President Peter P. Lejins; and Lithuanian American Council, Inc., President Leonard Simutis.

History
Since its inception, JBANC has worked with members of Congress, the White House, the State Department, and other federal agencies to promote the Baltic-American agenda. The group focuses heavily on fostering democratic principles, promoting human rights worldwide, supporting the establishment of peaceful relations among nations, and seeking the restoration and maintenance of security throughout Central and Eastern Europe.

During the late twentieth century, JBANC worked to secure admission for the Baltic countries into NATO and the European Union. When Estonia, Latvia and Lithuania all became full members of both organizations in 2004, JBANC turned its efforts to a host of issues that continue to demand attention today. These include bearing witness to the legacy of communism; defending the Baltic nations against unjust accusations and historical revisionism; promoting democracy beyond the Baltics; strengthening transatlantic integration and American engagement in the Baltics; and expanding relations with other ethnic organizations and NGOs in the U.S. and abroad.

After the Russian belligerence against Ukraine demonstrated Russia’s strategic threat to the United States and Europe, particularly to Estonia, Latvia, and Lithuania, the focus of the group shifted back to securing peace in the Baltics. JBANC advocates for the European Reassurance Initiative (ERI) that enables the U.S. and NATO allies to be better prepared for contingencies that may occur during Russia’s widening aggression against its neighbors. Also, JBANC draws attention to the hybrid warfare in Ukraine and Russia’s continued occupation of Crimea and territories in Georgia, and the continuous provocations against the Baltic countries, including the kidnapping of an Estonian intelligence officer, dangerous aerial and maritime incursions around the Baltic Sea, and its ceaseless campaigns of disinformation.

The organization hosted a conference, in Washington, D.C. on April 16–18, 2015, which focused on the theme: "History Repeated: Baltics and Eastern Europe in Peril?". Speakers at the event included President of Estonia Toomas Hendrik Ilves, former Lithuanian Prime Minister Andrius Kubilius, European parliamentarian Artis Pabriks, along with Ambassador John Heffern, James Kirchick, Liz Wahl, Paul Goble, Paul Joyal, David Kramer, Luke y, and others.

JBANC held its Twelfth Baltic conference in Washington, D.C. on May 19–20, 2017 under the topic of "New Realities: The Baltic Region in a Changing World." 

JBANC held its Thirteenth Baltic Conference in Washington, D.C. on November 9, 2019. Some key speakers included the Prime Minister of Estonia, Jüri Ratas, the U.S. ambassadors to Estonia, Latvia, and Lithuania, as well as Michael Carpenter, Managing Director of the Penn Biden Center for Diplomacy and Global Engagement at the University of Pennsylvania.  Dr. Carpenter was later nominated by President Joe Biden to serve as the Permanent Representative of the United States of America to the Organization for Security and Cooperation in Europe, and was confirmed by the United States Senate on November 3, 2021.

In 2018, JBANC hosted the first Baltic Advocacy Day, in which Baltic-American constituents were encouraged to meet with their members of Congress to voice concerns over issues relevant to the Baltics. The second Baltic Advocacy Day happened on November 8, 2019 in Washington, DC  and the third, a Baltic Advocacy Week, took place virtually from March 8 - 12. The 2021 Baltic Advocacy Week also took place virtually.

References

External links
 Joint Baltic American National Committee, Inc.
 Estonian American National Council, Inc.
 American Latvian Association, Inc.
 Lithuanian American Council, Inc.

Non-profit organizations based in Washington, D.C.
Civic and political organizations of the United States
Estonian-American history
Latvian-American history
Latvian-American culture in Maryland
Lithuanian-American history
Lithuanian-American culture in Maryland
Rockville, Maryland